Lepidozonates prominens is a moth in the family Lecithoceridae. It was described by Kyu-Tek Park, John B. Heppner and Sang-Mi Lee in 2013. It is found in Thailand.

References

Moths described in 2013
Torodorinae